Reckless Eyeballing may refer to:
Reckless Eyeballing, a 1986 novel by Ishmael Reed
Reckless Eyeballing, a film by Christopher Harris shown at the 2005 New York Underground Film Festival
Reckless Eyeballing, a 1995 art installation by Keith Piper